Miram Merad (born 1969) is a French-Algerian professor in Cancer immunology and the Director of the Marc and Jennifer Lipschultz Precision Immunology Institute (PrIISM) at the Icahn School of Medicine at Mount Sinai (ISMMS) in New York, NY. She is the corecipient of the 2018 William B. Coley Award for Distinguished Research in Basic Immunology and a member of the United States National Academy of Sciences.

Education and career 
Miriam Merad received her M.D. from the medical school at the University of Algiers in 1985 and completed her residency in hematology and oncology at the Paris Diderot University. After obtaining a Master's degree in Biotechnology from the Paris Diderot University, she moved to Stanford University to perform a PhD in the laboratory of Edgar Engleman. Merad’s clinical training in Hematology / Oncology and bone marrow transplantation in the Hôpital Saint-Louis and Institut Gustave Roussy in Paris shaped her initial interest in immunotherapy and inspired her move to Stanford to study dendritic cell-based vaccines with Engleman. Realizing that very little was known about myeloid cell development, Merad collaborated with Irving Weissman at Stanford, who provided her with the tools to study the origin of macrophages and dendritic cells. Merad's collaboration with Weissman resulted in a series of ontogeny studies that led to the re-writing of textbook chapters describing the origin of macrophages and dendritic cells.  She was first recruited to the ISMMS in 2004 and promoted to the rank of associate professor with Tenure in 2007 and to Full Professor in 2010. She obtained an Endowed Chair in Cancer Immunology in 2014.

In 2016, Merad was appointed Director of the Immunology Institute at ISMMS, which had been founded by Lloyd Mayer and Sergio A. Lira in 2007. The institute was renamed the Precision Immunology Institute (PrIISM) to reflect Merad's vision of transforming the institute to encompass a new, dedicated focus on human immunology and accelerating the translation of research advances made in foundational immunology in preclinical models into new therapeutic approaches. Under Merad's leadership, PrIISM has launched and co-founded with other ISMMS institutes, many programs and centers that support highly productive collaborations between physicians and scientists and enhance synergy between fundamental, translational and clinical research initiatives. These centers and programs include the Human Immune Monitoring Center, the Microbiome Translational Center, the Center for Inborn Errors of Immunity, the TARGET and INTERACT programs and the Center for Computational Immunology.

Research 
Miram Merad's early studies were among the first to identify the mechanisms that control the development and functional identity of tissue resident dendritic cells and macrophages. In particular, her laboratory established  the  embryonic  origin  of  tissue  resident macrophages, microglia and Langerhans cells and investigates their  distinct  contributions to health  and  disease. These studies have revealed the critical contribution of tissue resident macrophages to organ physiology including synaptic pruning, gut peristaltism, fat  metabolism and vascular integrity. The Merad laboratory identified a new subset of dendritic cells, the tissue resident CD103+ DC lineage, that are specialized in anti-viral and anti-tumor immunity.  Current research in her lab focuses on the role that dendritic cells and macrophages play within the tumor microenvironment and on how tumors prevent the normal anti-tumor functions of these cells. The Merad lab generates detailed transcriptional and epigenetic atlases of dendritic cells and macrophages that are available as resources to uncover new insights into the regulatory networks and molecular identity of these myeloid cells.

In addition to her research program, Merad has published articles on new approaches to cancer immunotherapy clinical trials, how Long COVID can be classified, the importance of immigrants to science in the US and written about her experiences as a mother and a scientist.

Honors 
 President-elect of the International Union of Immunological Societies. 
 Member of the American Society for Clinical Investigation.
 William B. Coley Award for Distinguished Research in Tumor Immunology
 Member of the United States National Academy of Sciences.
 Highly Cited Researcher since 2017 Thomson Reuters.

Notable publications

References

External links
Merad Lab at the Icahn School of Medicine

Algerian women scientists
Algerian emigrants to the United States
Algerian academics
Living people
Stanford University alumni
Icahn School of Medicine at Mount Sinai faculty
French immunologists
1969 births